The Costa Rica–Panama border is the 348 km (216 mi) international boundary between Costa Rica and Panama. The border in its present state is demarcated by the Echandi-Fernandez Treaty of 1941.

The border between the two countries runs between the Pacific and Caribbean coasts, through the Cordillera Central. The Echandi-Fernandez Treaty defined the current border as follows:
It begins at the mouth of the Sixaola River in the Caribbean Sea, following the valley of this river to its influx in the Yorkin River.
Thence continuing upriver on the bottom of the river valley up to the parallel in the length 9°30'N.
Then continuing in a straight line to the meridian at 82°58'10"W.
From there it continues south along this meridian to the summit of the Cordillera de Talamanca, which separates the Caribbean waters and Pacific waters.
It follows this ridge to Mount Pano where it meets the ridge that divides the waters of the tributaries of the Golfo Dulce and the Charco Azul Bay.
From here it follows the ridge until the end of Punta Burica on the Pacific Ocean.

References 

 
Borders of Costa Rica
Borders of Panama
International borders